Sten Selander (1 July 1891 – 8 April 1957) was a Swedish writer and scientist. He made his literary debut in 1916, and was awarded the Dobloug Prize in 1952. He was a lecturer in plant biology in Uppsala, and was a member of the Swedish Academy.

References

1891 births
1957 deaths
Swedish male writers
Swedish biologists
Members of the Swedish Academy
Academic staff of Uppsala University
20th-century biologists